Dursun Aksoy (1944 - July 14, 1983) was the Turkish administrative attaché in Brussels, Belgium, who was assassinated in 1983.

Death
Dursun Aksoy, 39, a father of three, was assassinated on 14 July 1983 near his home on Avenue Franklin Roosevelt in Brussels' embassy section. He was about to start his car, when a man walked to the window and fired two shots, hitting Aksoy in the neck and chest. The diplomat died on spot. The gunman fled. Witnesses described the assassin as a well-built man, 30 to 35, with thick black hair and mustache, 5 feet 8 inches, wearing blue jeans and a striped polo shirt.

Aftermath
Two Armenian militant groups, ASALA and JCAG, took responsibility for the assassination. A man who spoke a mixture of English and French called UPI and provided details about the color of Aksoy's car and his number plate, to support his claim that the murder was committed by JCAG.

The murder remains unsolved.

See also
List of unsolved murders

References 

1940s births
1983 murders in Belgium
1983 deaths
Assassinated Turkish diplomats
Turkish people murdered abroad
Terrorist attacks attributed to Armenian militant groups
Justice Commandos of the Armenian Genocide
Aksoy, Dursun
People murdered in Belgium
Terrorism in Belgium
Belgium–Turkey relations
Year of birth missing
Deaths by firearm in Belgium